Hijiyama-bashi is a Hiroden station (tram stop) on Hiroden Hijiyama Line, located in Hijiyama-hon-machi, Minami-ku, Hiroshima.

Routes
From Hijiyama-bashi Station, there are one of Hiroden Streetcar routes.

 Hiroshima Station - (via Hijiyama-shita) - Hiroshima Port Route

Connections
█ Hijiyama Line

Hijiyama-shita — Hijiyama-bashi — Minami-kuyakusho-mae

Around station
Hijiyama Park
Hijiyama River
Hijiyama Bridge

History
Opened on December 27, 1944

See also

Hiroden Streetcar Lines and Routes

References

External links

Hijiyama-bashi Station
Railway stations in Japan opened in 1944